The 2011 season of competitive football in Thailand.

The season will begin on 12 February 2011 for the Thai Premier League and Division 1 and 25 December 2011 for the Thai Premier League.

Promotion and relegation (pre-season) 
Teams promoted to Thai Premier League 2011
 Sriracha
 Khonkaen
 Chiangrai United

Teams relegated from Thai Premier League 2010
 Bangkok United

Teams promoted to Thai Division 1 League 2011
 Buriram
 F.C. Phuket
 Chiangmai
 Chainat
 J.W. Rangsit
 Bangkok
 Gulf Saraburi

Clubs Serving Bans for Thai Division 1 League 2011

 Nakhon Pathom

Teams relegated from Thai Division 1 League 2010
 Prachinburi
 Nara United

Diary of the season
 20 January 2011: Chonburi won the Kor Royal Cup beating Muangthong United 2-1 at Suphachalasai Stadium.

National team

Friendly matches

Olympic qualifiers

Palestine was awarded a 3-0 win after Thailand fielded an ineligible player, Sujarit Jantakul. The original score was 1–0 to Thailand.

1–1 on aggregate. Thailand won after penalties, but Palestine will replace them in the second round after fielding an ineligible player.

Honours

References 

 
2011